Nikki Lane (born October 17, 1983) is an American country music singer-songwriter and artist. She has released four albums: Walk of Shame, All or Nothin', Highway Queen, and Denim & Diamonds.

Early life and education 
Lane was born in Greenville, South Carolina, and dropped out of high school there. She then worked as a fashion designer for a time, before moving to Los Angeles in 2006 and later to New York City. After doing so, she broke up with a country musician, who left her to record an album in Alabama; this experience inspired her to begin writing country music songs. Lane, who now lives in Nashville, also owns and operates a clothing store called "High Class Hillbilly".

Career 
On September 27, 2011, Lane released her debut album, Walk of Shame, on Iamsound Records. She co-wrote 'Gone, Gone, Gone' with producer Lewis Pesacov of Fool's Gold. Her second album, All or Nothin, was released on New West Records on May 6, 2014. It was produced by Dan Auerbach of the Black Keys, whom she met at a flea market. Auerbach allowed Lane to record the album at his studio, Easy Eye Sound Studio, for free. Lane has said that working with Auerbach in the making of this album was very easy and natural for her. All or Nothin features a duet between Lane and Auerbach, "Love's on Fire".

In 2017, Lane recorded a duet with comedian and musician Ben Hoffman, better known by his raunchy country artist persona Wheeler Walker, Jr., for the song "Fuckin' Around" on his sophomore album Ol' Wheeler. She is credited as "Kacey Walker".

Lane's album  Highway Queen was released on February 17, 2017. It was recorded near Dallas, TX at The Echo Lab from February to June 2016 with Nikki's boyfriend Jonathan Tyler, as well as the other members of her current touring band. Two music videos were released ahead of the album's release; the title track, "Highway Queen", in which Nikki and friends crush cars with a monster truck, and Jackpot, in which Nikki and Jonathan Tyler successfully try their luck in old Sin City, ultimately resulting in a Vegas chapel wedding.

In another video released in August 2017 for the song Send The Sun, Nikki and the band play live on a vintage country television studio set and also perform a two-person dance routine.

Unfortunate circumstances struck Nikki's band around the time of recording Highway Queen, when lead guitarist Alex Munos was sidelined by cancer and started receiving treatment in May 2016. He would later recover and return to the band around the time of Highway Queens release.

In July 2017 former drummer Ben Eyestone passed away from colon cancer. He had played drums on Nikki Lane's first two albums.

In 2021 Nikki co-wrote and performed "Breaking Up Slowly" on the Lana Del Rey album Chemtrails Over the Country Club.

In 2022, she performs "Never Git Drunk No More" with Ken Casey on the Dropkick Murphys album This Machine Still Kills Fascists. The album is based on never-used-before texts written by Woody Guthrie. In September of 2022, she released her fourth album entitled Denim and Diamonds, which features Josh Homme from the band Queens of the Stone Age on guitar and drums. Homme also produced, mixed, and co-engineered the record.

Critical reception
Lane's sound has been compared to that of Wanda Jackson, as well as the sound of Neko Case's early albums. She has also been referred to as the First Lady of Outlaw Country.

Walk of Shame
A review of Walk of Shame in Exclaim! stated that Lane has "a petulant, Valley of the Dolls lyrical style" and praised her vocal delivery. Another review of this album was written by Mark Deming, who said that "Lane has confidence to spare and a voice that lives up to her own self-worth" and gave the album 3.5 out of 5 stars. Deming also said that Lane has yet to fully master the art of recording music in a studio.

All or Nothin
According to review aggregator Metacritic, All or Nothin has received generally favorable reviews from critics, with a score of 79 out of 100. Holly Gleason, writing in Paste, awarded it a score of 8.5 out of 10 and said that the album's songs "read like Polaroids from a wild heart gone ragged". Gleason also praised Auerbach's production, which she called "savvy". Lane told Billboard that she was flattered at the positive reception this album had received from the press.

Discography

Studio albums

EPs
 Gone, Gone, Gone (2011)

Singles

Awards and nominations

References

American women country singers
American country singer-songwriters
Country musicians from South Carolina
Musicians from Greenville, South Carolina
Living people
New West Records artists
1983 births
21st-century American singers
21st-century American women singers
Iamsound Records artists
Singer-songwriters from South Carolina